Gustave Marie Victor Fernand Samazeuilh (2 June 1877 in Bordeaux – 4 August 1967 in Paris) was a French composer and writer on music.

He studied music with Ernest Chausson until the latter's death in 1899, and then attended the Schola Cantorum de Paris, where he became a pupil of Vincent d'Indy and Paul Dukas. He was also much influenced by the impressionist school, and wrote a number of works for piano which are reminiscent of Debussy. His output was marked more by "fine craftsmanship" (to quote Slonimsky) than by quantity or commercial success.

He produced many piano transcriptions of orchestral works, and also wrote musical biography.

References

External links

1877 births
1967 deaths
Musicians from Bordeaux
French male composers
20th-century French composers
20th-century French male musicians